Crunch is a chocolate bar made of milk chocolate and crisped rice. It is produced globally by Nestlé with the exception of the United States, where it is produced under license by the Ferrara Candy Company, a subsidiary of Ferrero.

History 
Nestlé Crunch was first introduced in 1938. 

In the UK it was sold as Dairy Crunch from introduction in mid 1960s up to 1990s when it was rebranded as Crunch. 

In May 2013, Nestlé USA announced that Nestlé Crunch agreed to begin using 100% certified cocoa beans throughout the entire line of its standard Crunch bars for the first time. This plan came to fruition as part of the Nestlé Cocoa Plan, the company’s global initiative to help improve the lives of cocoa farmers and the quality of their products while assuring a sustainable cocoa supply for years to come. 

In January 2018, Nestlé announced plans to sell its U.S. confectionery brands (including the U.S. rights to Crunch) to Italian chocolatier Ferrero SpA, maker of Nutella, for US$6.9 billion. Ferrero folded the acquired brands into the operations of the Ferrara Candy Company. The sale was rumoured to be because of low growth in the mainstream chocolate market due to newer competitors such as Kinder and the increased variety of snacks, making it challenging for mainstream candy bars like Crunch. Products sold to Ferrero include (but are not limited to) the Crunch Bar, Butterfinger, Nerds, and LaffyTaffy, and more marking this as the first time in nearly a century of its existence that the Crunch bar has ever traded ownership. 

Nestlé discontinued the traditional packaging technique of wrapping the bar in aluminium foil, sleeved inside a paper label, in favour of more conventional packaging practices, most likely due to the excessive time it took in double-packaging the bar. The chocolate bar can now commonly be found in a single-ply inner metallized boPET polyester film, typical of convenience foods packaging.

Additional products 
Besides the chocolate bar, Nestlé also produces or licenses other Crunch products:
Buncha Crunch are candy pieces made of milk chocolate with crisped rice mixed in. Released in 1994, they were originally only sold exclusively in movie theaters; as of May 2012, they have become available in most grocery stores.
Crunch White is a candy bar made with white chocolate instead of milk chocolate.
Crunch Ice Cream Bars have a firm, vanilla-flavoured ice cream center, surrounded by a milk chocolate coating with crisped rice mixed in.
Crunch with Caramel is a candy bar made with milk chocolate and crisped rice mixed in, containing a caramel center.
Crunch with Peanuts is a limited edition candy bar made with milk chocolate and crisped rice mixed in, containing peanuts.
Dark Crunch with Caramel is a limited edition candy bar made with dark chocolate and crisped rice mixed in, containing a caramel center.
Crunch Stixx is a variant of Crunch, which consists of wafers and Crunch Candy Creme.
Crunch Dark Stixx is a variant of Crunch, which consists of wafers and Crunch Dark Candy Creme.
Crunch Dark and Buncha Crunch Dark consisted of crisped rice and dark chocolate. Crunch Dark is available in single-bar packages. Bunch Crunch Dark is available in resealable stand-up bags and concession box sizes. The products were launched in collaboration with Candytopia. These products were supposedly available for a limited time through July 2018 but were never discontinued. 
Crunch Mocha is a discontinued candy bar made with mocha instead of milk chocolate.
Crunch Crisp is a full size candy bar made with wafers and chocolate creme.
Crunch Cereal is a chocolate breakfast cereal with crispy rice and wheat clusters.
YoCrunch brand yogurt features Crunch mix-ins in both Strawberry and Vanilla yogurt flavors. The pieces themselves resemble Buncha Crunch.
Crunchettes are "Bite Size" Pieces of Crunch.
Crunch Biscuit is a candy bar made with small pieces of biscuit replacing crisped rice.

Slogans 
List of slogans used for Crunch bars

 S·CRUNCH·OUS
 Music to your mouth
 Munch Now. Munch Some Later.
 For the Kid in You.

See also
 Krackel
 List of chocolate bar brands

References

External links 

 Official U.S. website

Brand name confectionery
Chocolate bars
Nestlé brands
Products introduced in 1938
Ferrero SpA brands